The Melbourne International Flower and Garden Show is a flower show held annually since 1995 in early April each year except 2020, in Melbourne, Australia. It is located in the World Heritage Site of Carlton Gardens and the Royal Exhibition Building. It is the largest horticultural event in the southern hemisphere, attracting over 100,000 visitors. It is rated among the top five flower and garden shows in the world.

This show went on a one-year hiatus in 2020 due to the coronavirus pandemic in Australia.

References

External links
Melbourne International Garden and Flower Show
Florist Melbourne - Bud Flowers

Horticultural exhibitions
1995 establishments in Australia
Flower shows
Flower festivals in Australia
Garden festivals in Australia